Adérito Assunção Tiny Glória Esteves (born Sanpriz, Ponte da Barca, 8 October 1985) is a Portuguese rugby union player. He plays as a wing.

Esteves has played for Rugby Clube de Oeiras, AEIS Agronomia and Grupo Desportivo Direito, in Portugal, winning four titles of National Champion for the "Lawyers" team in 2008/09, 2009/10, 2010/11 and 2012/13.

Esteves has 34 caps for Portugal, since his first game, a 17-37 loss to Russia, in Lisbon, for the IRB Nations Cup, at 13 June 2006. He wasn't called for the 2007 Rugby World Cup, but has been a regular player for the "Lobos" since then. He has 3 tries scored, 15 points on aggregate for his national team.

Esteves is one of the best players for the Sevens national side.

References

External links
 
 

1985 births
Living people
Portuguese rugby union players
São Tomé and Príncipe rugby union players
Portugal international rugby union players
Rugby union wings
Portugal international rugby sevens players
São Tomé and Príncipe emigrants to Portugal
Sportspeople from Viana do Castelo District